Lavell William Crump (born April 11, 1974), better known by his stage name David Banner, is an American rapper, record producer, and actor.

Born in Brookhaven, Mississippi, Banner's family moved to Jackson, Mississippi, where he was raised. Banner graduated from Southern University with a bachelor's degree, then attended University of Maryland Eastern Shore to pursue a master's. He started his music career as a member of the rap duo, Crooked Lettaz, before going solo in 2000 with the release titled Them Firewater Boyz, Vol. 1. In 2003, Banner signed to Universal Records, where he released four albums: Mississippi: The Album (2003), MTA2: Baptized in Dirty Water (2003), Certified (2005), and The Greatest Story Ever Told (2008).

Banner is also a noted producer, having produced music for himself, Trick Daddy, T.I., Lil Boosie and Lil Wayne among others.

Early life 
Lavell William Crump was born in Brookhaven and raised in Jackson, Mississippi, the elder son of Zeno Crump Jr., Jackson district fire chief, and Carolyn Crump. He graduated from Provine High School in Jackson in 1992 and then attended Southern University in Baton Rouge, Louisiana, his mother's alma mater. At Southern University, Crump served as president of the Student Government Association and received a bachelor's degree in business. He later attended the University of Maryland Eastern Shore to pursue a master's degree in education but later left the program to pursue his music career full-time.

Music career

1995–2000: Beginnings and Them Firewater Boyz, Vol. 1 
Crump's stage name "David Banner" is taken from the lead character of the television series, The Incredible Hulk. With several of his friends, Banner sent some demo tapes to Jackson, Mississippi radio station, WJMI. Celebrity Manager Glenn Sweety G Toby discovered the group and signed them to Neil Levine at Penalty Records. In 1999, Banner and rapper Kamikaze as the duo, Crooked Lettaz, released Grey Skies (Penalty Recordings). In 2000, Banner released his solo debut album, Them Firewater Boyz, Vol. 1. Released on the independent label, Big Face Records, the album sold around 7,000 copies.

2003–2006: Mississippi: The Album, MTA2: Baptized in Dirty Water and Certified 
After assessing various offers, Banner and manager, Scott Johnson, decided to sign with Universal Records subsidiary, SRC Records, which was founded by Steve Rifkind who had previous success as CEO of the heavyweight hip-hop label, Loud Records. In 2003, Banner produced T.I.'s single, "Rubber Band Man", which reached No. 30 on the Hot 100, No. 15 on the R&B chart, and No. 11 on the Rap chart. In 2003, Banner released his first major label album, Mississippi: The Album. Mississippi included the hit single, "Like a Pimp", featuring Lil Flip. "Like a Pimp" peaked at No. 48 on the Billboard Hot 100 chart, No. 15 on the Hot R&B/Hip-Hop Songs chart, and No. 10 on the Hot Rap Tracks chart. He released the follow-up album the same year titled MTA2: Baptized in Dirty Water which yielded the hit, "Crank It Up", featuring Static Major.

In 2005, Banner released his third major label album, Certified. The album's first single was "Ain't Got Nothing" which featured Magic & Lil Boosie, followed by the second single, "Play", which reached No. 7 on the Hot 100 chart, No. 5 on the R&B chart, and No. 3 on the Rap chart. The third single, "Touching", featured Jazze Pha and reached No. 54 on the R&B chart. In 2006, Banner appeared on "Seein' Thangs", a song about Hurricane Katrina featured on DJ Shadow's album "The Outsider". A remix featuring Bay Area hyphy rappers Nump and Gold also was made. Outside projects for Banner have included writing the theme song to the video game, Saints Row, as well as contributing to the music for a commercial promoting the video game, Marvel vs Capcom 3: Fate of Two Worlds. Banner played the part of Tehronne in Black Snake Moan (2006).

2007–present: The Greatest Story Ever Told and The God Box 
Banner appeared on the Adult Swim pilot That Crook'd 'Sipp, which premiered on May 13, 2007. His single "Play" was used as the background music in the pilot's first television promo. That same year, he played the character of Mo, in the film This Christmas. On July 15, 2008, Banner released his fourth major label album, The Greatest Story Ever Told. The album's first single titled "9mm" featured Akon, Lil Wayne, and Snoop Dogg. Banner then produced his next two singles: "Get Like Me" featuring Chris Brown and Yung Joc, "Get Like Me" reached No. 16 on the Hot 100, No. 7 on the R&B chart, and No. 2 on the Rap chart. and "Shawty Say", featuring Lil Wayne. In 2008, Banner was featured on the track, Superfriend, from the 2008 album, The Sound, by gospel R&B duo, Mary Mary.

In 2010, he played Bosch in the film The Experiment and as Jay, a gang leader from the hood in Stomp the Yard: Homecoming. He has also worked with international artists such as Seeda, a Japanese Rap Artist where he was featured in the song, Life Song in 2010 on Seeda's Breathe Album. Banner released his debut mixtape titled Sex, Drugs and Video Games on May 22, 2012, as a free download. It is also available on his website, davidbanner.com, where fans are encouraged to make a donation of at least $1 for the sixteen song mixtape. The first single off the mixtape is titled "Amazing" featuring Chris Brown. It was announced that Universal Republic Records was going defunct, all of the artists on the roster moved from the label including (David Banner) was being moved to Republic Records making the label itself revived.

In 2013, David Banner appeared in the music video for the song Confessions by Lecrae. Banner played Earl Gaines, Cecil Gaines' father, in the 2013 film The Butler. Banner plays Jay, a criminal who is interrogated, in the 2014 film Ride Along. David Banner was featured on a remix of Mexican American rapper Kap G's single "La Policia", which stirred hype throughout the media and the internet.

Humanitarian and political work 

In November 2006, Banner was awarded a Visionary Award by the National Black Caucus of State Legislators in Jackson, Mississippi in recognition of his humanitarian work in response to Hurricane Katrina.
On September 25, 2007, Banner testified before Congress at a hearing about racism and misogyny in hip hop music titled From Imus to Industry: The Business of Stereotypes and Degrading Images. He defended his use of offensive language and argued: "Change the situation in my neighborhood and maybe I'll get better." In his opening statement, Banner stated: "I can admit there are some problems in hip hop but it is only a reflection of what's taking place in our society. Hip hop is sick because America is sick."

Discography 

Studio albums
 Them Firewater Boyz, Vol. 1 (2000)
 Mississippi: The Album (2003)
 MTA2: Baptized in Dirty Water (2003)
 Certified (2005)
 The Greatest Story Ever Told (2008)
 #TheGodBox (2017)

Collaborative albums
 Death of a Pop Star  (2010)

Filmography

Awards 
 BET Hip Hop Awards
 2008, Best Hip-Hop Video ("Get Like Me") with Chris Brown & Yung Joc [nominated]
 2008, Best Hip-Hop Collabo ("Get Like Me") with Chris Brown & Yung Joc [nominated]
 2008, Best Producer [nominated]
 Ozone Awards
 2008, Best Rap/R&B Collaboration ("Get Like Me"), featuring Chris Brown & Yung Joc [nominated]

References

External links 

David Banner: "In Mississippi, poverty has become a way life."

1974 births
Living people
21st-century American male actors
African-American activists
African-American crunk musicians
African-American male actors
African-American male rappers
African-American poets
African-American record producers
American hip hop record producers
American male film actors
American male television actors
American political activists
American social activists
Male actors from Mississippi
Rappers from Mississippi
Musicians from Jackson, Mississippi
Southern hip hop musicians
Southern University alumni
SRC Records artists
University of Maryland Eastern Shore alumni
Businesspeople from Jackson, Mississippi
Actors from Jackson, Mississippi
21st-century American rappers
21st-century American poets
21st-century American male musicians
Universal Motown Records artists
21st-century African-American writers
20th-century African-American people